Sadiq ul Khairi (May 11, 1915, Delhi - January 26, 1989, Karachi, Sindh) was an Indian born Pakistani Urdu novelist, playwright and translator. He was the son of well-known Urdu writer Allama Rashid Al-Khairi and younger brother Razzaq Al-Khairi.

Early life and education 
Khairi was born on May 11, 1915 in Delhi, British India. His father, Allama Rashid Al Khairi was a prominent Indian scholar and writer. Sadiq al-Khairi's grandfather Maulvi Abdul Qadir was one of the prominent scholars of Delhi. The famous Urdu writer Nazir Ahmad was the son-in-law of Maulvi Abdul Qadir.

Works

Death 

References

Biobiography  
 

1915 births
1989 deaths
20th-century Indian short story writers
20th-century Urdu-language writers
Urdu-language translators
Urdu-language novelists
Urdu-language short story writers
Writers from Delhi
Pakistani writers